Seleucia (also transliterated as Seleuceia, Seleukeia, Seleukheia; formerly Coche or Mahoza, also Veh Ardashir) was an ancient city near the Euphrates river and across the Tigris from the better-known Seleucia on the Tigris, in Sittacene, Mesopotamia. The editors of the Barrington Atlas of the Greek and Roman World place the city at Sliq Kharawta in central Iraq.

References
 Richard Talbert, Barrington Atlas of the Greek and Roman World,, p. 91.
 Ardashir I

External links
 

Seleucid colonies
Sittacene
Former populated places in Iraq